This is a list of feature-length films that have instances of domestic violence.

List of films

References

Domestic violence